Toni Savevski (born 14 June 1963) is a Macedonian former professional footballer who played as a midfielder. Savevski is widely regarded as one of the best foreign players to have played in the Greek football league. After retiring from as a footballer in 2001 he became manager and managed several clubs in Cyprus, most notably Omonia.

Club career
Savevski was born in Bitola, SR Macedonia. He started his career in Pelister Bitola and then played for Vardar Skopje, where he won the league in 1987, but due to a point deduction punishment of Partizan was overturned, the title eventually was awarded to the latter. In winter 1988 he signed for AEK Athens at the request of Dušan Bajević. Savevski quickly developed into one of the team's consistent players and, alongside Stelios Manolas, became the permanent leaders of the great AEK of the 90s. He combined very well and assisted all the great stikers that played in the club during his era, such as Batista, Dimitriadis, Alexandris, Kostis, Nikolaidis. He also scored some very important goals, the most important of all being this against Rangers in Glasgow, for the UEFA Champions League qualifiers in the summer of 1994. He served AEK for 13 years winning the league four times and the Greek cup three times. He is the third foreigner in appearances in the history of the league, behind Krzysztof Warzycha and Predrag Đorđević. Savevski urgently stopped football in the yellow-black jersey in January 2001 and within a few days he became the coach of the team, as a "duo" with Eugène Gerards, a position in which he remained until the end of the season.

International career
He made his senior debut for Yugoslavia in an August 1988 friendly match away against Switzerland and earned a total of 2 caps for the team, scoring no goals, before debuting for Macedonia in an October 1994 European Championship qualification match against Spain. He earned another 8 caps and his final international was a September 2000 FIFA World Cup qualification match against Slovakia.

Managerial career
In January 2001, after the then coach AEK Athens, Giannis Pathiakakis resigned, Savevski retired as a footballer overnight, in order to take the position of coach on the yellow-black bench, with Eugène Gerards as technical advisor. In the summer of 2001, the administrative instability of the club resulted in the Savevski and Gerards leaving. In the season 2001–02 he was the coach for Apollon Limassol. In 2002 he coached Omonia, where in 2003 he won the Cypriot First Division and the Cypriot Super Cup, before leaving in 2004. In the summer of the same year, he assumed the position of technical director of the AEK Athens academies. During his tenure, the infrastructure departments of the club were organized and developed. Players such as Sokratis Papastathopoulos, Kostas Manolas, Viktor Klonaridis, Panagiotis Tachtsidis and Vasileios Pliatsikas were the results of his work. In the summer of 2010, Savevski was promoted to the position of head scouting of the team. By September 2012, he returned to Omonia as head coach until December 2013.

Honours

As a player

AEK Athens 
Alpha Ethniki: 1988–89, 1991–92, 1992–93, 1993–94
Greek Cup: 1995–96, 1996–97, 1999–2000
Greek Super Cup: 1989, 1996
Greek League Cup: 1990
Pre-Mediterranean Cup: 1991

As a coach

Omonia
Cypriot First Division: 2002–03
Cypriot Super Cup: 2003

Personal life
Savevski had humble upbringings and grew up in Bitola. He later moved to Athens, Greece after his first son, Victor was born. His second son was born in Athens.

References

External links

Profile at MacedonianFootball.com 

1963 births
Living people
Sportspeople from Bitola
Association football midfielders
Yugoslav footballers
Yugoslavia international footballers
Olympic footballers of Yugoslavia
Footballers at the 1988 Summer Olympics
Macedonian footballers
North Macedonia international footballers
Dual internationalists (football)
FK Pelister players
FK Vardar players
AEK Athens F.C. players
Yugoslav First League players
Super League Greece players
Yugoslav expatriate footballers
Macedonian expatriate footballers
Expatriate footballers in Greece
Yugoslav expatriate sportspeople in Greece
Macedonian expatriate sportspeople in Greece
Macedonian football managers
AEK Athens F.C. managers
Apollon Limassol FC managers
AC Omonia managers
Macedonian expatriate football managers
Expatriate football managers in Greece
Expatriate football managers in Cyprus
Macedonian expatriate sportspeople in Cyprus